AKM Sarwar Jahan Badsha is a Bangladeshi politician who was elected to parliament in the 2018 Bangladeshi general election. He has two sons named Shaeekh al Jahan and Taheer Razon and has a daughter named Mouli.

Early life and education 
He was born in Kushtia District. He is an ex student of University of Rajshahi.

Career 
He was the president of Bangladesh Chhatra League's unit of Rajshahi University.
He is elected for the first time in Jatiyo Sangsad from Kushtia-1 constituency as a Bangladesh Awami League candidate.

References

Living people
11th Jatiya Sangsad members
Year of birth missing (living people)